Emily Marie Consuelo Estefan (born December 5, 1994) is an American singer. She is the daughter of producer Emilio Estefan and the Cuban singer Gloria Estefan. She has produced and directed her own debut album, Take Whatever You Want.

Early life and education

Emily Estefan was born to Emilio Estefan and Gloria Estefan on December 5, 1994, in Miami Beach, Florida. Her mother Gloria was involved in a tour bus accident in 1990, and she had been told that she would never have another child. She has a brother, Nayib, who is 14 years her senior. Through her father, Estefan has Lebanese heritage. Her maternal grandmother Gloria Fajardo (née Perez) was a Cuban nightclub performer who fled the Cuban Revolution to Dade County, Florida. Her paternal cousin is model Lili Estefan.

Estefan attended Miami Country Day School, where she excelled in basketball and music. In 2016, Estefan graduated from the Berklee College of Music in Boston, Massachusetts.

Career

Public singing debut
Her public singing debut came in a 2014 performance of Where The Boys Are at the Hollywood Bowl. She performed in front of a 100,000-person audience at the "Miami Beach 100 Centennial Concert" on March 26, 2015, and performed on national television for The Today Show with her mother on April 27, 2015.

Debut single release
At the time of her debut single release on December 2, 2015, she was already regarded as an accomplished drummer, guitarist, bassist, keyboardist and singer. She has a songwriting credit for "If I Never Got to Tell You" from the musical On Your Feet!.

Estefan wrote, recorded, produced and performed her debut album Take Whatever You Want at her very own Fairy Light Studios (Boston, Massachusetts). Her mother, Gloria, directed the debut single "F#ck to Be" from the album. Estefan officially released music videos for "Reigns (Every Night)," "F#ck to Be" (two versions—clean and explicit) and "Purple Money." She founded her own music label Alien Shrimp Records—to not only launch her own music but to also serve as a home base for new and emerging artists. In 2016, she entered into a three-year partnership with RED Distribution via Alien Shrimp Records for the physical and digital distribution (U.S. and international) of the label's entire roster.

In February 2017, Estefan was selected as Elvis Duran's Artist of the Month and performed her hit "Reigns (Every Night)" on the 4th hour of NBC's Today (hosted by Hoda Kotb and Kathie Lee Gifford and broadcast nationally).

First concert and Kennedy Center Honors performance
Estefan performed her first major concert on February 2, 2017, at Gusman Concert Hall during the University of Miami Frost School of Music’s Festival Miami. She played drums, guitar, and keyboard, in various music styles. Following the concert, her album Take Whatever You Want was released at 12:01 AM. Later the same year, Estefan paid tribute to her mother (who was being honored for her distinguished music career) at the Kennedy Center Honors by performing the song "Reach."

In 2020, Estefan became a co-host of Red Table Talk: The Estefans, a spin-off of the Facebook Watch talk show Red Table Talk alongside her mother Gloria and paternal cousin Lili Estefan.

Discography

Albums
Take Whatever You Want (2017)

Singles
"F#ck to Be" (2016)
"Reigns (Every Night)" (2017)

Personal life
Estefan is openly lesbian and her parents are LGBTQ advocates. She has been in a relationship with Gemeny Hernandez since December 2016.

Awards and honors 
In June 2020, in honor of the 50th anniversary of the first LGBTQ Pride parade, Queerty named her among the fifty heroes “leading the nation toward equality, acceptance, and dignity for all people”.

References

External links
 Official website

1994 births
American entertainers of Cuban descent
American women drummers
American women singer-songwriters
American people of Asturian descent
American people of Lebanese descent
American people of Spanish descent
Hispanic and Latino American women singers
Living people
Musicians from Miami
People from Miami Beach, Florida
Singer-songwriters from Florida
LGBT Hispanic and Latino American people
American LGBT singers
American LGBT songwriters
American lesbian musicians
Lesbian singers
Lesbian songwriters
21st-century American women singers
21st-century American singers
21st-century American drummers
Miami Country Day School alumni
20th-century American LGBT people
21st-century American LGBT people
American lesbian writers